Mudiwa Hood (born 1985) is a Zimbabwean hip hop/gospel artist and actor.

Background
Hood was born Mudiwa Mtandwa in 1985 in Harare and grew up in Chitungwiza, attending Nyazura High School. He later earned Bachelor of Science degrees in Economics and Phycology, as well as a Masters in Business Administration (Finance) from Africa University.

He began his recording career using the surname "Hood", which came from his biological great-grandfather. In 2019, Hood announced he was legally changing his surname to Hood because the Mtandwa surname came from his grandfather's step-father after his great-grandfather Hood abandoned the family.

In 2012, Hood began recording his first songs at CraigBone Studios in Chitungwiza, releasing the singles "", "", and "". In 2013, Hood signed a record deal with Demon Proof Records but left the label in 2015, launching HoodNation Records a year later.

"" (the Shona language title translates to English as "I Made Money") topped Zimbabwean music charts for several weeks and won four awards within a year of its release. In 2015, Steward Bank name Hood as a brand ambassador, using "Ndaita Mari" in its commercials, as well as brand ambassador for Ster-Kinekor Zimbabwe.

Hood's follow-up releases "Number 1" and "" were on the Star FM Zimbabwe Gospel Greats top-20 chart for several weeks with "Number 1" being on the chart from September 2013 to May 2014. The 2014 single "Love yaSolo" landed on the Power FM Zimbabwe top-10 chart, as did the 2015 release "Shinga," featuring Nox.

In 2017, Hood was cast in the ZBC TV drama series Muzita Rababa, which was named best Zimbabwe television series at the 2020 National Arts Merit Awards. In the series, he portrays a church choir leader. June 2021, Mudiwa Hood started a reality television programme, UnderTheHood, for ZBC TV.

In 2020, Hood authored and launched a book titled Shut Up and Make Money.

Discography

Albums
Magnet (2012)
Mwana waMambo (2015)
The Street Preacher (2017)

Awards

Personal life
Hood was married to Angelica Colchèita-Hood. They divorced in 2020. They have one child.

References 

1985 births
Zimbabwean gospel singers
Zimbabwean rappers
People from Chitungwiza
Living people